Prophet's Greatest Hits is a collection of hit songs by Three 6 Mafia during the early Prophet Entertainment years.

Track listing 
Disc 1
 Let's Ride Nigga - 4:40
 Da Summa - 4:41
 Gettem' Crunk - 4:23
 Throw Yo Sets In Da Air - 5:20
 Smoked Out, Loced Out (Pt. 3) - 4:46
 Gotta Touch 'Em (Pt. 2) - 4:53
 Late Nite Tip - 5:16
 Triple Six Clubhouse - 2:43
 Tear Da Club Up (Da Real) - 4:33
 Where's Da Bud - 3:53
 'Bout The South (featuring Project Pat, The Dayton Family) - 4:26
 Porno Movie - 5:24
 Good Stuff - 4:16
 Funkytown - 5:00

Disc 2
 DJ Black Intro - 1:14
 Where's Da Bud - 4:57
 Smoked Out, Loced Out - 6:00
 Gotta Touch 'Em (Pt. 2) - 6:01
 Da Summa - 5:30
 DJ Black Interlude - 0:51
 Throw Yo Sets In Da Air - 6:49
 Funkytown - 5:54
 Good Stuff - 6:20
 Porno Movie - 4:37
 DJ Black Interlude - 0:18
 Late Night Tip - 6:24
 Triple Six Clubhouse - 2:00
 Tear Da Club Up - 6:25
 Let's Ride Nigga - 4:48
 Get 'Em Crunk - 3:33
 DJ Black Outro - 0:48
 Bout the South - 3:03

References

2007 greatest hits albums
Three 6 Mafia compilation albums
Gangsta rap compilation albums